Pilibhit Junction is important railway station in Izzatnagar railway division. The station code is PBE. The station consists of 5 platform .It lacks many facilities Including Escalator Coach Indicator System and Basic Amenities Of Passenger.

Pilibhit junction railway station is not well connected with many cities of india like Mathura Agra Kanpur Varanasi Mumbai Ujjain Indore Kota Ajmer Surat Aligarh Rampur Kathgodam Dehradun Etc.
The length of platform is 900 m (2953 ft) which is 4th longest platform in India. The station is under the administrative control of the North Eastern Railways. Computerized reservation facility is provided.

Trains

References

Railway stations in Pilibhit district
Izzatnagar railway division
Pilibhit